The Ministry of Culture and Sports of the Republic of Uzbekistan is a body of the Government of Uzbekistan that responsible for state policy in cultural spheres, Art, Cinematography, archives, inter-nations issues, and sports.

References

Government of Uzbekistan
Culture and Sports